Die Gazette (English: The Gazette) is a political culture magazine from Munich. It has appeared online since 1998 and printed since 2004. It is published by Fritz R. Glunk.The printed edition included 6,800 copies in 2014 according to publisher.

Its authors of Die Gazette include, Carl Amery, Giscard d'Estaing, Rita Süssmuth, Uri Avnery, Christian Ude and Seyran Ates.

References

External links
 

1998 establishments in Germany
Cultural magazines published in Germany
German-language magazines
Political magazines published in Germany
Magazines established in 1998
Magazines published in Munich